Theodor Habicht (4 April 1898 – 31 January 1944) was a leading political figure in Nazi Germany. He played a leading role in the Austrian Nazi Party. During World War II, he was involved in the administration of Nazi-occupied Norway until his dismissal by Adolf Hitler. He later served in the Wehrmacht and was killed in action on the Eastern Front at Nevel in 1944.

Early years
Born in Wiesbaden and educated in his hometown and Berlin, he volunteered for the German Imperial Army in 1915, serving on the Western Front and at Isonzo in Italy. Briefly involved with communism after his 1919 demobilization, he soon took part in skirmishes against the Spartacist League before settling into various low-level white-collar jobs.

Nazi leader
Habicht joined the Nazi Party in July 1926 and established a number of local journals for the group. In April 1927 he became Deputy Ortsgruppenleiter (Local Group Leader) in Wiesbaden. He soon moved up to Ortsgruppenleiter, and from 20 May 1928 was the leader of the Nazis on the Wiesbaden City Council. In 1930 Habicht was elected to the Provincial Landtag of Hessen-Nassau. By September 1931, he had also been elected to the Reichstag for electoral constituency 19, Hesse-Nassau, and was reelected at each subsequent election through 1938.

Under orders from Adolf Hitler, he was sent to Austria in 1931 to oversee the reorganization of the Austrian Nazi Party. Later given the title Landesinspekteur he was the effective leader of the Austrian Nazis, despite titular leadership resting with Landesleiter Alfred Proksch. Under Habicht the Nazis experienced growth, mostly at the expense of the Heimwehr, many of whose members switched over to Nazism. Initially, Austrian Chancellor Engelbert Dollfuß attempted a conciliation, notably offering Habicht two Nazi cabinet seats, before trying to get Italy to exert pressure on Hitler to restrain Habicht's anti-government activities. Habicht was deported in March 1933 after the Austrian government finally decided to ban the Nazi Party outright. In response, Habicht set up a leadership-in-exile in Munich which directed a campaign of terror against the Dollfuß regime which culminated in a failed coup attempt in the murder of Dollfuß in July 1934 under the command of Austrian SS leader Fridolin Glass. An unpopular figure with many of the Austrians, he was excluded from the country after this failure as Hitler placed the blame on Habicht, who had been responsible for determining the details of the coup attempt.

Post-Anschluss
Severely discredited by the failure, Habicht went into seclusion in the Harz mountains before being allowed to take up the post of Oberbürgermeister (Mayor) of Wittenberg in February 1937, serving through September 1939. He was then selected to be the next Oberbürgermeister of Koblenz, but due to being called up for military service, he never formally took up this position. His reputation partially restored, Habicht took up a more important role in November 1939 when he was appointed Undersecretary of State in the German Foreign Office. As part of his duties, he was sent to Norway in 1940 to investigate the organization of government in the newly occupied territory, and he called for the removal of the Vidkun Quisling government and its replacement with an administrative council. Initially, he had hoped to give any regime more legitimacy by placing the popular Paal Berg at its head rather than the minor figure of Quisling, although Berg rejected any such settlement. However, when his plans were rejected by Johan Nygaardsvold and Haakon VII of Norway, Hitler once again lost faith in Habicht and ordered him into the Wehrmacht in September 1940. He spent the remainder of his life on the Eastern Front with the rank of Hauptmann commanding an infantry company. He was promoted to battalion commander shortly before he died in action at Nevel.

References

External links
 
 

1898 births
1944 deaths
Politicians from Wiesbaden
People from Hesse-Nassau
Communist Party of Germany politicians
Nazi Party politicians
Officials of Nazi Germany
Members of the Reichstag of the Weimar Republic
Members of the Reichstag of Nazi Germany
German Army personnel of World War I
German Army personnel killed in World War II
German Army officers of World War II
Military personnel from Wiesbaden